Vespertine is the fourth studio album by Icelandic recording artist Björk. It was released on 27 August 2001 in the United Kingdom by One Little Independent Records and in the United States by Elektra Entertainment. Production on the album began during the filming of Dancer in the Dark. With Vespertine, Björk aspired to create an album with an intimate and domestic feeling, deviating from the brash sonority of her previous studio album Homogenic (1997).

The musical style of the album reflected Björk's newly found interest in the minimal and intricate electronic music of producers such as Opiate, Console and the duo Matmos, who were all enlisted for the album. With the rising popularity of Napster and music downloads, she also composed arrangements with thin, "icy" sounding instruments whose quality would not be compromised when downloaded and played on a computer, including the harp, the celesta, clavichord, strings and custom music boxes. Assisted by Matmos, Björk created "microbeats" from various commonplace sounds, such as that of shuffling cards and ice being cracked. Lyrically, the album revolves around sex and love—sometimes explicitly—inspired by her at the time new relationship with Matthew Barney; other lyrical sources include the poetry of E. E. Cummings and British playwright Sarah Kane's Crave.

Vespertine peaked at number 19 on the US Billboard 200 and at number 8 on the UK Albums Chart. It was widely acclaimed by critics, with praise centred on its erotic, intimate mood and sonic experimentation. The album appeared on several publications' lists of the best albums of 2001 and of the decade, and has often been considered Björk's best album to date. It was certified gold in Canada, France, and the United Kingdom. Three singles were released from Vespertine: "Hidden Place", "Pagan Poetry", and "Cocoon". In 2001, she enlisted Zeena Parkins, Matmos, and a choir of Inuit women to embark on the Vespertine World Tour, which took place at theatres and small venues, in favor of acoustics over audience numbers. Björk, a self-titled coffee table book containing photographs of the artist throughout her career, was released simultaneously with the album.

Background and development 

Björk had released her previous studio album, Homogenic, in 1997. The album's style differed from her previous two releases, described by her as "very emotionally confrontational and [...] very dramatic". She also described "All Is Full of Love"—Homogenics closing track—as the first song on Vespertine, as it opposed the rest of the album's "aggressive, macho" aesthetic. In 2000, she starred in Lars von Trier's Dancer in the Dark, and composed its soundtrack, Selmasongs. Her performance was praised: the film was awarded the Palme d'Or at the Cannes Film Festival and she received the Best Actress award. On 25 March 2001, Björk attended the 73rd Academy Awards—as "I've Seen It All" was nominated for Best Original Song—wearing a swan dress designed by Marjan Pejoski that caused a media frenzy and was widely criticised.

While she worked on the film, she also began producing her next album, writing new music, and teaming with new collaborators. She has said "Selmasongs was the day job and Vespertine was the hobby". The earliest sessions took place in Spain with programmer Jake Davies. Her new relationship with artist Matthew Barney, and the tension while filming Dancer in the Dark, have been referred to as the two major forces that shaped what would become Vespertine. As the process of filming demanded that she be extroverted, the new music she was creating became hushed and tranquil as a way to escape. Björk commissioned Valgeir Sigurðsson to relocate some of his studio equipment from Iceland to Denmark where Dancer in the Dark was being filmed. While living in Copenhagen, she also contacted the electronic musician Thomas Knak (also known as Opiate), after having enjoyed his 1999 album Objects for an Ideal Home. Björk's musical taste shifted from the "clang and clatter" and "thumping techno" that characterised Homogenic, as she grew tired of "big beats".

Björk then set about making a record with a domestic mood featuring "everyday moods and everyday noises translating into melodies and beats", hence its working title Domestika. Marius de Vries told Sound on Sound that the project was driven by an "overriding aesthetic of being homely and comfortable", which had "all to do with Björk wanting to make a record as a reaction to the wanderings and the pain she experienced making Dancer in the Dark, and how much that had taken out of her, to make a record about the place you come back to after you've wandered." During this time, she also began to use her new laptop to write music, and Vespertine has been retrospectively referred to as "her laptop album". In 2022, she recalled the impact this technology had on the record:
It was [...] the time when I got my first laptop, in '99, and I had total freedom from the studio, which is kind of a huge moment for me and also for women, because [as an author] you can always write wherever you are, but musicians couldn't really do this, you know. If you wanted to have more than just you and your accordion or piano or acoustic guitar, you had to go in a studio and that's very expensive. And then you had to also go into the patriarchy system and work with the engineers, the producers... [...] What was amazing for me was to get the laptop and realize that I could do it all [with it]. Now we have forgotten what this feeling is like, but it was like somebody had come with a space shuttle and delivered you all the tools you wanted when you were a 5-year-old.
For the string and music box arrangements, she used Sibelius scorewriter software. In Iceland, programmers Jake Davies and Marius de Vries joined Björk for a writing session, laying down more tracks, in addition to nine already mixed. Then, she "set up camp [...] during summer" in a New York City loft, and began to work with harpist Zeena Parkins. Much of Vespertine was "composed, crafted and edited" in that loft, in what has been called the "Domestika sessions". Some tracks were recorded as an overdub "on top of a slave mixdown" of the Spanish sessions. As she wanted to write her own songs on music boxes, Björk contacted a music box company requesting transparent acrylic boxes because she wanted the sound to be "as hard as possible, like it was frozen". Björk decided to use instruments whose sound would not be compromised when downloaded from sites such as Napster. She explained:
I use micro-beats, a lot of whispery vocals, which I think sound amazing when they're downloaded because of the secrecy of the medium. The only acoustic instruments I would use would be those that sound good after they've been downloaded, so the harp, the music box, celeste and clavichord. They're plucky sounds. [...] And the strings [...] ended up being more panoramic textures in the background. It's all about being in a little house, on your own. [...] The strings would be like white mountains outside.

On Homogenic, every track was built around a loud beat, but in Vespertine Björk wanted to make a "microcosmos of thirty or forty beats interacting". To do this, she recorded noises around her house to make beats out of them. Once the songs were almost finished, Björk contacted the duo Matmos, who she considered "virtuosos" in the field, and sent them various songs to work with. They added beats made from the noise of crushing ice and shuffling cards, among others. In her documentary Minuscule, Björk explained that this process consisted of "taking something very tiny and magnifying it up to big", intending to convey the "sensation that you've been told a secret", that is also present in micrographs. Marius de Vries and Björk did a lot of the sound design on Vespertine with a text-based synthesizer called Supercollider. Although he described it as "horrendous and impenetrable once you first get it", de Vries admitted: "There is something about typing commands in and hearing the noises come out which is very different from tweaking knobs and it really does take you in surprising directions. It's a way of disrupting the normal circuitry between you and the sound-making machinery."

Her relationship with Barney influenced her lyrics, which were now more intimate, detailed, and revealing as opposed to those of her past works. A particular example is "Cocoon", which is sexually explicit. The eventual title change of the record reveals its changing nature. Writer and critic Mark Pytlik notes that, "where [Domestika] signified a focus of extracting magic from the platitudes of everyday life, [Vespertine] [...] suggested a creation of magic through much more powerful forces. In fine style, Björk had set out to write an album about making sandwiches. She'd ended up with an album about making love". A stylistic antecedent was her poem "Techno Prayer", published in Details magazine in July 1996, which would later be used as part of the lyrics of "All Neon Like". It featured thematic ideas such as cocooning and thread-weaving that she would later explore on Vespertine.

"Heirloom" was based on an existing instrumental track from electronic musician Console's album Rocket in the Pocket (1998), titled "Crabcraft" (which itself samples Orchestral Manoeuvres in the Dark's "Sacred Heart"). Björk contacted Console in early 2000 and they met in London; she then added her vocals on top. "Undo" was written during a two-week session with Knak that January in Reykjavík. Björk recorded her vocals on top of Knak's minimalist rhythmic backbone, and months later she had added a full choir and string section. "Cocoon", also produced by Knak, was one of the last songs to be written for the album; its melody came to Björk in a sudden rush and she contacted him. Knak took it as a chance to make a more minimal track, similar to his own releases. His original treatment of "Cocoon", made with an Ensoniq ASR-10, appeared relatively intact in the final version. Björk also worked with Bogdan Raczynski on the song "Who Is It", but the track did not follow the direction of the record and was subsequently included on the album Medúlla.

In a 2015 interview with The Pitchfork Review, Björk expressed frustration over to the lack of recognition for all of her work on Vespertine and her other albums. She said:I did 80% of the beats on Vespertine and it took me three years to work on that album, because it was all microbeats – it was like doing a huge embroidery piece. Matmos came in the last two weeks and added percussion on top of the songs, but they didn't do any of the main parts, and they are credited everywhere as having done the whole album. [Matmos'] Drew [Daniel] is a close friend of mine, and in every single interview he did, he corrected it. And they don't even listen to him. It really is strange.

Composition 

Björk has stated that she wanted the album to sound like "modern chamber music", referring to the times where "the most ideal music situation was in the home, where people would play harps for each other". She argued that with the popularity of festivals like Woodstock, the situation became "the opposite", and that with the advent of Napster, the Internet, music downloading and DVD, "we've come full circle and the most ideal musical situation now, [...] is back to the home". She also considers Vespertine to be the opposite of her previous studio album Homogenic, the former being an introverted, quiet, winter record; the latter a loud, dramatic, summer record. Writer and critic Mark Pytlik writes, "Her appetite for thumping techno had been, temporarily at least, subsumed by a desire for stark melodies and minimalist production".

Although generally considered an electronica album, as with other Björk releases, it has been difficult for critics to classify Vespertine within a musical genre. The album—and Björk's body of work in general—is considered art pop. The Orlando Weekly wrote that with the album, Björk "[took] her modernist art-pop further into the abstract". Music journalists have noted the experimental nature of the record. According to Joseph Hale of Tiny Mix Tapes, Vespertine'''s music "finally made good on its dubious 'trip-hop' label", and described it as a combination of "psychedelic techno, chamber music, and chorale together into modal constructions that swelled and receded like emotions (or psylocibin)". The music was also considered psychedelia by The Dallas Morning News and American critic Jim DeRogatis. David Fricke of Rolling Stone wrote "Vespertine is the closest any pop-vocal album has come to the luxuriant Zen of the new minimalist techno". Björk has also described the album as "more electronic folk music", and Jason Killingsworth of Paste referred to the album as a "folktronica gem". Vespertines music has also been categorised as ambient, and glitch pop, with Björk's performance described as that of an "art-rock torch singer.

Stylistically, Vespertine incorporates elements of both art and dance music. For example, the instrumentation of choir, strings, and harp is suggestive of Romantic art music, while the "synthesised keyboard sonorities, filtering effects and complex percussive sounds" are elements characteristic of dance-based pop. According to Nicola Dibben: ...the way in which classical and dance-based elements are made to sit alongside one another as part of the same texture mediates the relationship between the two: the spiritual and the sensual are shown to be compatible, perhaps even suggesting that the sensual is spiritual, and that it can facilitate transcendence and hence grant access to a utopian world. Vespertine is also characterised by "the obsession with sonic traces of analog technology – that is, the pervasive use of loops, static and white noise – despite the obviously digital orientation of twenty-first-century electronics." Unlike previous albums like Debut and Post, "electronic sounds are the norm, and the acoustic sounds become the interjections." Influenced by the 1999 album New Ancient Strings, a recording of kora duets by Toumani Diabaté with Ballaké Sissoko, Björk said she "messed up the sound of too angelic instruments, like the harp or the glockenspiel" on Vespertine.

Björk's voice is used as a supplement to "the complex electronic textures". Her vocals often appear to be recorded close to the microphone and with little treatment, and sung in a sometimes "unstable whisper", conveying a sense of close proximity and reduced space suitable for the intimate lyrics.

 Songs 

The album opens with "Hidden Place", which features a soprano section and strings, "over the top of a warm, intimate melody". Michael Hubbard of musicOMH felt the track was reminiscent of Homogenics "Hunter", but less focused on the beats. NME called it progressive folk, while Drowned in Sound wrote it was electro. Björk sings about "how two people can create a paradise just by uniting", as she intones: "I'm so close to tears/And so close to/Simply calling you up/And simply suggesting/We go to that hidden place". "Cocoon" is "based around an exploratory bassline and beats that sound like fingertips on skin". Discussing the glitch nature of the track, Björk said, "when you take technology and use the areas where it breaks, where it's faulty, you're entering a mystery zone where you can't control it". Lyrically revolving around making love, the song alternates between metaphors like "Who would have known/That a boy like him/Would have entered me lightly/Restoring my blisses", and explicit lines such as "He slides inside/Half awake, half asleep" and "Gorgeousness/He's still inside me". According to Michael Cragg of The Guardian, the song "best represents the album's sense of heavy-lidded, post-coital hibernation". Björk sings a breathy, "whispered, near-cracking falsetto" on the track.

"It's Not Up to You" has been described as a "dizzying ballad" and a song that lifts the album upward. Michael Paoletta of Billboard described the track as "melancholy". Its lyrics are about "love for the unknown devices that culminate in 'perfect days'", and "pleas to find beauty in unlikely places". The "caressing lyrics" of "Undo" assure that: "It's not meant to be a strife/It's not meant to be a struggle uphill". Biographer Mark Pytlik writes, "Undo" is a held hand, a reassuring reminder that anything can happen once you let it. If you are in pain, undo it, Björk suggests, no hint of disingenuousness in her voice, over climbing strings and a rising choir". "Pagan Poetry" is a "harp-splashed" song that concerns unrequited love. The track builds slowly, "with Björk wailing over swelling keyboard crescendos", until, at the four-minute mark, "all the music drops away, leaving Björk utterly exposed" as she sings "I love him, I love him/I love him, I love him/I love him, I love him". The song also features "a flotilla of music boxes with an Asian-teahouse touch". The instrumental interlude "Frosti" has been described as "metallic tundra". Its sound stems from a music box, creating an intimate, fairy tale-like effect.

"Frosti" fades into "Aurora", while "a warm, faintly crunchy sound" is heard. These are samples of footsteps in the snow—the work of Matmos—re-appropriated as the song's "subtly shifting beat". "Aurora" has been described as "something that appeals to a child-like imagination", and having a "magical and airy quality". In the lyrics, she addresses a Nature goddess, and sings about "literally dissolving with pleasure" as she "prays to become one with the pure color of the northern lights". One of Björk's broodiest compositions, "An Echo, a Stain" is underpinned by a creeping choir line and nibbling clicks, and features an "unresolved, ominous tension" that is atypical of her writing style. Most of the song's lyrics speak directly to incidents in Sarah Kane's 1998 dark-themed play Crave, so much so that it was titled "Crave" up to the last minute. "Sun in My Mouth" is an adaptation of E. E. Cummings' poem "I will wade out/Till my thighs are steeped in burning flowers", with an emphasis on the vocal and accompaniment provided by a string orchestra, a harp, and soft electronica. The track's lyrics have been considered a "startling allusion to masturbation", positioned "within the fantasy-like imagery of burning flowers, sea-girls, darkness and the sun". This track, and the album in general, have a "resounding message of sexual liberation" that reinforces Björk's "resistance to the socially constructed categories of gender", which has generated analysis associating it with Donna Haraway's 1983 essay, A Cyborg Manifesto.

"Heirloom" alters "between what sounds like a samba preset on a vintage Wurlitzer organ and skittering breakbeats, and is decorated with inverted synthtones and analog keyboards". The song's lyrics tell a "fuzzy story" about a recurring dream, while "[likening] the art of singing to swallowing and exhaling 'glowing lights'" as Björk sings: "During the night/They do a trapeze walk/Until they're in the sky/Right above my bed". Film director Harmony Korine wrote "Harm of Will"'s lyrics. The Slate album review noted the minimalist nature of the track, pointing out a lack of hook, beat and melody. It is a slow song, as is the closing track, "Unison". The latter "[contains] a refrain directly inspired by [Björk's] experience in Dancer in the Dark and a healthy dollop of self-effacing humor evoked to counter the balance". It "brings beats and strings together in a final crescendo that also manages to incorporate a little jungle".

 Imagery 
 Music videos 
{{Multiple image
|align =right
|direction=vertical
|upright=scaling factor
|width =
|image1= Pagan Poetry music video.jpg
|caption1=The controversial music video for "Pagan Poetry", directed by Nick Knight, features highly stylised images of unsimulated sex, going in hand with Vespertines central theme of eroticism and intimacy.
|image2= Haeckel Hexacoralla.jpg
|caption2=Fauna illustrations by Ernst Haeckel, including the one pictured above, were used as a backdrop during the Vespertine World Tour.
}}
Once the album was finished, Björk wrote a manifesto describing a very introverted fictional character, "the character who did Vespertine", and sent it to M/M Paris, Nick Knight and Eiko Ishioka. They directed the music videos for "Hidden Place", "Pagan Poetry", and "Cocoon" respectively. It was the threesome's directorial debut. She said:
Vespertine is an album made by a character who's very . And it's about the universe inside every person. This time around, I wanted to make sure that the scenery of the songs is not like a mountain or a city or outside, it's inside, so it's very internal. So I guess all three videos are very internal. [...] Sort of how you communicate with the world in a very intimate, personal way.

The music video for "Hidden Place" was directed by Inez van Lamsweerde and Vinoodh Matadin and co-directed by M/M (Paris). It was shot in London over four days in February 2001. It was originally planned for a song from Selmasongs, but Björk felt the project was more appropriate for Vespertine. The video consists of close-up shots panning around Björk's face, as fluids flow in and out of her facial orifices. M/M (Paris) explained the concept behind the video:We always wanted to get as close to her as we could, as we all felt she had never been portrayed as the "real" and beautiful woman she is. This is somehow taboo, to observe a pop star with no makeup from a distance of half an inch. Then the idea of the liquid works as a visualization of all possible emotions pulsating and circulating in her very busy brain. The loop idea was a main point for us as well, trying to extend the usual time frame of pop video super-fast editing, to make it hypnotising, mesmerising and irritating, like an eternally burning fireplace.

Nick Knight, who had previously shot the cover art for Homogenic, directed the music video for "Pagan Poetry". It is about a woman preparing herself for marriage and for her lover, as she sews a wedding dress onto her skin. As she had asked him to make a video about her love life, Knight gave Björk a camcorder and asked her to shoot her own private scenes. Shots of skin being pierced were also recorded with this camera; the people being pierced were five women who "were into subculture and piercings" and Björk herself, who only pierced her ear. This first two-thirds of the video contains a great deal of post-production by Peter Marin, who gave the image its abstract watercolor-like effect. The shots of Björk with her Alexander McQueen topless wedding dress were filmed in super 35 format. The main idea behind the music video was: "to do something with the moving image that was a mirror of what was happening musically". Although the music video has been well received by critics, it was highly controversial and banned from MTV in 2001.

The music video for "Cocoon" was directed by Eiko Ishioka and was shot in April 2001 in New York City. One of Björk's most avant-garde music videos, it: "plays with minimalist white for both costume and bleached eyebrows, treating Björk as a geisha whose makeup extends over her entire nude body". Red threads emerge from her nipples and circulate between her breasts and nose, finally enveloping her in a cocoon. Björk actually wore a very close-fitting body suit. Although not as controversial as the "Pagan Poetry" music video, it was still banned from MTV. The three music videos were included in the DVDs Volumen Plus (2002) and Greatest Hits – Volumen 1993–2003 (2002).

 Artwork 

The album's ethereal artwork mirrors its "delicacy and introverted romance". The cover art, shot by Inez van Lamsweerde and Vinoodh Matadin in Los Angeles, California, is a black and white photograph of Björk lying down on the patterned ground next to a swimming pool, covering her eyes from the sun and wearing her Marjan Pejoski swan dress that caused a stir at the 73rd Academy Awards. The duo M/M (Paris), known for applying and integrating their work on photographs (so called dessin dans l'image, or "drawings in the picture"), illustrated the cover, featuring a swan and the album's title with feathers. Björk thought swans embodied Vespertines music, describing them as "a white, sort of winter bird" and "very romantic". Vespertine came with a booklet of M/M (Paris) artwork.

Michael Hubbard of musicOMH commented positively on it, writing "the spine of the CD is entirely white, while the rest of the sleeve features innovative photography and artwork, preparing the listener before they even hear the album for something very special". Jason Killingsworth of Paste wrote: "When I see the swan, my eye drifts past its beak to those pillowy white feathers, recalling the plushness and warmth of a down comforter. Feathers so white they evoke the purity of freshly fallen snow blanketing the ground outside while you sip a coffee by the fire, both hands curled around the mug's warm ceramic finish".

Academic Nicola Dibben has likened Vespertine'''s artwork and promotion to representations of the Greek myth of Leda and the Swan, emphazising the erotic overtones of both. She stated:
The cover art to Vespertine [...] explores the theme of personal identity through visual means: hence Björk is featured in black and white, shading her eyes, lips slightly parted in an unmistakably erotic pose. For the first time in this context, however, she does not meet the viewer's gaze directly. Instead, the superimposed image of a swan provides a protective shield between Björk and the viewer. Both this photograph and Björk's subsequent appearances at promotional events dressed as a swan metonymically evokes not only the mythic figure of Leda, but more particularly the familiar legend in which she exchanges her husband, the Spartan king Tyndareus, for the God Zeus when he approaches her in disguised form. As in other visual representations of this myth, the entwined bodies of Leda and the swan permit a representation of erotic intimacy that would prove unacceptable if realised in a more literal fashion.

 Release and promotion Vespertine was released later than One Little Indian Records had intended. Originally, the album's release was scheduled for May, but by March it had been put back to August, so as to enable Björk to work on the album's promotion. On 22 May 2001, Björk premiered six songs off the new album in an intimate concert at the Riverside Church in New York City, accompanied by Matmos and Zeena Parkins. On 6 August, "Hidden Place" was released as the album's lead single, its music video having premiered in July. It was released as two CDs and a DVD, featuring B-sides "Generous Palmstroke", "Foot Soldier", "Mother Heroic" and "Verandi". Vespertine was released on 27 August, as a double 12" record, CD and compact cassette. To coincide with the release of the album, Björk also released an eponymously titled coffee table book, created by her and edited and designed by M/M (Paris). A second single, "Pagan Poetry", was released on 5 November 2001 as two CDs and a DVD, featuring a remix by Matthew Herbert, "Domestica", "Batabid", an Opiate remix of "Aurora", and a music video directed by Nick Knight. Towards the end of 2001, Vespertine was released as a DVD-Audio. "Cocoon", the album's third single, was released on 11 March 2002. Its music video had premiered in February. Once again, the single was released as two separate CDs and a DVD, with "Pagan Poetry", "Sun in My Mouth" and "Amphibian" as B-sides. It’s Not Up To You was planned to be the fourth single from Vespertine. However, all promotional efforts for Vespertine were halted in mid 2002 following Bjork’s pregnancy.

Together, Elektra, and New York-based independent marketing firm Drill Team, created the Björk Vespertine Syndicate (BVS), a group of 30-plus websites that had exclusive access to non-album tracks, music videos, and concert/rehearsal footage. To promote the album, Björk appeared in various magazines in mid-2001, including: The Fader, Q, Pulse, URB, USA Today, InStyle, Vibe, Us, Nylon, Index, CMJ New Music Monthly and, Spin. Magazines Dazed & Confused and Les Inrockuptibles featured a special issue with texts, photographs, and different CDs issued randomly, each with a different song from the album. The Times issued a Björk special, featuring videos, music, photographs, and a competition to see Björk perform. She also appeared on several TV shows, including: The Rosie O'Donnell Show, The Tonight Show with Jay Leno, Space Ghost Coast to Coast, The David Letterman Show and, Charlie Rose, among others.

In early August 2001, Björk confirmed the first set of dates for the Vespertine World Tour which would take place at opera houses, theatres, and small venues, with favourable acoustics for the concerts. She enlisted Matmos, Zeena Parkins, a choir of Inuit girls from Greenland, and conductor Simon Lee; the tour opened at the Grand Rex in Paris on 18 August. While in Paris, she held a press conference to discuss the album but gave no individual interviews saying that: "she'd rather do music than talk about it." While in France she also received the National Order of Merit at the Ministry of National Education in Paris. Another press conference was held in Barcelona on 3 November 2001 while touring in Spain. A 16 December 2001 performance at the Royal Opera House in London was released as the DVD Live at Royal Opera House in 2002. A DVD release featuring a behind-the-scenes look at the tour, titled Minuscule, was released at the end of 2003. Vespertine Live, a live album consisting of songs recorded during the Vespertine World Tour, was included in the 2003 box set Live Box; it also includes a live version of "All Is Full of Love", a song from  Homogenic and "Overture" from Selmasongs.

 Commercial reception 
By September 2001, the album had reached number 19 on the Billboard 200 and the top spot on the Top Electronic Albums chart, with One Little Indian head Derek Birket declaring that the album had sold over 1.2 million copies in Europe alone. That month, the album also became number one on the album charts in Iceland, Sweden, Denmark, France, Norway, and the European Top 100 Albums chart. In addition, Vespertine charted in the top 10 of Canada, Italy, Germany, Japan, the United Kingdom, Finland, Belgium, Switzerland, Sweden, Austria and Australia. The album has been certified Gold in Canada, France, Switzerland, and the United Kingdom.

Lead single "Hidden Place" reached the top spot of the singles charts in Spain, also charting in the top 40 in the United Kingdom, Canada, Italy, Denmark, Norway, Finland, Belgium and France. Following release "Pagan Poetry" also performed well in Spain, while entering the French chart at number 49 and the UK chart at number 38. "Cocoon" performed more poorly, charting at number 61 in France and number 35 in the United Kingdom.

 Critical reception 

Upon release, Vespertine received universal acclaim from music critics. At Metacritic, which assigns a normalised rating out of 100 to reviews from mainstream critics, the album received an average score of 88, based on 28 reviews. Heather Phares from AllMusic called it "an album singing the praises of peace and quiet", praising it for proving that "intimacy can be just as compelling as louder emotions". Anthony Carew from About.com gave the album the highest rating and said it was "quite possibly the best album of the '00s". He considered the album to be self-aware of "the digital epoch [that] had just dawned upon the realm of recorded music" in the early 2000s, noting that it is "not just a product of this brave new non-world, but wholly informed by that." The A.V. Clubs Keith Phipps found it to be: "an album both timeless and of the moment, an avant-garde electronic-pop exploration of classic themes". David Fricke of Rolling Stone felt that Vespertine was: "the sound and sentiment of a woman exulting in the power and possibility of her gift, one who has finally figured out how to grow up without growing old." In a later review for The New Rolling Stone Album Guide, Douglas Wolk described the album as "a banquet in the hall of Björk's personal erotics" and stated that "it's not the stuff of radio hits, but the music is spectacular".

An enthusiastic review came from The Wire, which felt that: "In the end, Vespertine commits its magic by daring to go places more obvious and more human than one would have ever expected." Calling it "one of the most impressive and cohesive" albums of the year, Tiny Mix Tapes found Vespertine to be Björk's most effective use of the studio as an instrument. Simon Reynolds, praised it in Uncut saying [It was] "Her best yet, it reminds me of the jackfrost wonderland of Cocteau Twins circa "In the Gold Dust Rush", of the bejewelled coldness of Siouxsie and the Banshees circa A Kiss in the Dreamhouse. The glittering sound fits the album's idea of inner riches, the treasure people keep hidden inside." Katy Widder, writer for PopMatters, believed the album was a masterpiece, stating that it challenged the predominant theories of rock music and gender, particularly a statement made by Simon Reynolds and Joy Press in the acclaimed book, The Sex Revolts: Gender, Rebellion, and Rock 'n' Roll: "Women have seized rock 'n' roll and usurped it for their own expressive purposes, but we've yet to see a radical feminization of rock itself." Chris Smith of Stylus Magazine praised the album for its nuance and delicacy, describing its sonic palette as "a breath of fresh air." Noting that Vespertine showed a more mature side of her, musicOMHs Michael Hubbard wrote that "It sounds like Björk has grown up [...]; while that would be a pity, it is also fascinating for anyone who loves her music. She is a legend in her time."Billboards Michael Paoletta applauded Vespertine for its "positive [introversion]", feeling some of the tracks "have the strength to bring tears (of joy and pain) to the eyes." Q also praised the album, stating that it "quietly proves that cutting-edge production and human contact aren't mutually exclusive." American music journalist Robert Christgau enjoyed the album's central theme of sex and wrote: "when she gets all soprano on your ass you could accuse her of spirituality". A more lukewarm review came from Pitchforks Ryan Schreiber, who felt that: "while undeniably beautiful, Vespertine fails to give electronic music the forward push it received on Björk's preceding albums". However, Pitchfork later named Vespertine the 92nd best album of the 2000s. David Browne of Entertainment Weekly said "her lyrics occasionally dive into the deep end" and "her voice is at times stiff", although he also wrote "when it all comes together, [...] Björk and her electronica collaborators create moving interplanetary chorals". Almost Cool wrote: "if there's one question to be raised with the album, it's that it's all simply so lush and nice that on some levels it fails to excite". Various reviews named Vespertine Björk's best album to date, including The A.V. Club, Rolling Stone, About.com, and PopMatters.

 Accolades 
In 2002, Vespertine was nominated for the Shortlist Music Prize, though the award went to In Search of... by N.E.R.D. The same year, the album received a Grammy Award nomination for Best Alternative Album, losing to Coldplay's Parachutes. In addition, Björk was nominated for Best International Female Solo Artist at the Brit Awards, and Best International Female Artist at the Italian Music Awards, while Vespertine was nominated for Album of the Year at the Icelandic Music Awards.

Critics' lists
The information regarding lists including Vespertine is adapted from Acclaimed Music, except where otherwise noted.

 Track listing 

Notes
  signifies an additional producer.
 "Sun In My Mouth" contains lyrics from "Impressions" by E. E. Cummings from Complete Poems: 1910–1962.
 "Unison" contains a sample of "Aero Deck" by Oval from Systemisch.

 Personnel 
Credits adapted from the liner notes of Vespertine''.Musicians Jake Davies – programming , beat programming 
 Damian Taylor – programming , beat programming 
 Guy Sigsworth – programming , choir arrangement , clavichord , clavichord arrangement , beat programming , celeste , celeste arrangement 
 Matthew Herbert – programming 
 Matmos – programming , beat programming 
 Björk – bassline , choir arrangement , harp arrangement , programming , music box arrangement , beat programming , string arrangement 
 Vince Mendoza – choir arrangement , orchestration , string arrangement 
 Thomas Knak – programming 
 Valgeir Sigurðsson – beat programming , programming 
 Zeena Parkins – harp arrangement , harp 
 Caryl Thomas – harp 
 Jack Perron – adaptation to music box 
 Marius de Vries – additional programming , beat programming 
 Martin Console – programming Technical Jake Davies – Pro Tools recording engineer ; Pro Tools , recording engineer , vocals recording 
 Damian Taylor – Pro Tools recording engineer 
 Valgeir Sigurðsson – Pro Tools recording engineer , Pro Tools , recording engineer 
 Leigh Jamieson – Pro Tools recording engineer 
 Jan "Stan" Kybert – Pro Tools 
 Eric Gosh – music box engineering
 Juan Garcia – assistant engineer 
 Damon Idins – assistant engineer 
 Eric & Rory – assistant engineers 
 Aarron Franz – assistant engineer 
 Adrian Dawson – 2nd assistant engineer 
 Ricardo Gary Walker – assistant
 Jason Spears – assistant
 Aaron – assistant
 Matt Fields – assistant
 Daniel Porter – assistant
 David Treahearn – assistant
 Björk – vocal editing 
 Mark "Spike" Stent – mixing Artwork'''

 Inez van Lamsweerde & Vinoodh Matadin – sleve design
 M/M Paris – sleeve design

Charts

Weekly charts

Year-end charts

Certifications and sales

See also 
 List of songs recorded by Björk
 List of Billboard number-one electronic albums of 2001
 List of number-one albums of 2001 (Spain)

Notes

References

Bibliography

External links 
 

2001 albums
Albums produced by Björk
Albums produced by Marius de Vries
Albums recorded at Olympic Sound Studios
Ambient albums by Icelandic artists
Björk albums
Electronica albums by Icelandic artists
Folk albums by Icelandic artists
Folktronica albums
Glitch (music) albums
One Little Independent Records albums